Shopping in Lahore is an important part of the social and economic culture of the city of Lahore, Pakistan. The South Asia largest and most spectacular mall Emporium Mall opened its doors on 30 June 2016.

Markets

Arts, handicrafts and furniture
Anarkali Bazaar
Main Market Gulberg
MM Alam Road
Defence Housing Authority

Books
Vanguard Books (Mall Road, near Regal Chowk)

Clothing and jewellery

Designer
 Fortress Stadium
 MM Alam Road
 Mall of Lahore
 H-Block Defence
 Y-Block Defence

Normal
Anarkali Bazaar
Ichhra
Mall Road
Main Boulevard Gulberg

Electronics
Hafeez Center in Gulberg
Hall Road
Cavalry Ground

Food
 Food Street, Anarkali
 Fort Road Food Street
 Food Street, Gawalmandi
 MM Alam Road
 Fortress Stadium shops
 Gaddafi Stadium shops
 H-Block Defence
 Y-Block Defence

Music
Fortress Stadium consists of several music shops selling English-language music and movies, as well as a collection of Pakistani and Indian titles.
Hall Road has music stores, with a higher proportion of Pakistani and Indian material.
Langay Bazaar, situated close to the Lahore Fort sells musical instruments.
Millat Music Palace

Commercial zones
Liberty Market
Main Market Gulberg
Mini Market Gulberg
Model Town Link Road
Garden Town Civic Centre
Allama Iqbal Town Commercial Zone
H-Block Defence
Y-Block Defence
Bahria Town Commercial Zone
Sukh Chayn Gardens Commercial Zone

Hypermarkets
Metro
Makro
Carrefour (formerly Hyperstar)

Shopping malls
Emporium Mall
Packages Mall
Fortress Square
Mall of Lahore
 Amanah Mall
Gulberg Galleria
 Siddiq Trade Center
 Xinhua Mall
 Imperial Mall
Pace Shopping Mall
Vogue Towers
Avenue Mall
Al Fatah Malls (3 malls)

References

Retailing in Lahore